Munna Creek is a locality split between the Fraser Coast Region and the Gympie Region, in Queensland, Australia.

Geography 
The western boundary of the locality is the Munna Creek watercourse, as is the northern boundary until Munna Creek joins the Mary River. The eastern boundary comprises the Mary River and then the Bauple Woolooga Road. The locality to the south east of Munna Creek is Miva.

History
Miva station was part of the Mount Uhra pastoral run owned by Gideon A. Scott in 1851. It was a sheep property.  At that time Munna Creek was described:-"for about ten miles above its junction with the Mary river, is navigable for boats, and is a broad sheet of fresh water, varying from fifteen to thirty yards wide."

Prior to the building of the Bauple Woolooga Road the Munna Miva road crossed the Mary River at the Miva Crossing. After the flood waters entered the Miva Crossing Hotel (Mr. J. Orphant's), notwithstanding the fact that it stood on an unusually high bank, the hotel was moved to the top of the hill where it later became a residence with a store in front.

Munna Creek Provisional School was officially opened on 26 May 1890 by its first teacher Miss Ryan. On 1 January 1909 it became Munna Creek State School. It closed on 12 December 1986. The school was at 1458 Bauple Woolooga Road.

In 1905  was reserved for a cemetery in the parish of Miva. In 1938 the Miva Cemetery was renamed the Munna Creek Cemetery, and the Dickabram Cemetery was renamed the Miva Cemetery. References to the Munna Creek Cemetery appear from 1910, which was just after the Dickabram Cemetery was establisihed. The Dickabram Bridge had been built near the new location of Miva.

Munna Creek Hall, also variously known as the Adventure Hall and the Munna Creek Public Hall, was officially opened on Saturday 18 August 1906. It was built by the Munna Creek Adventure Hall Company.

In March 1911 tenders were called to construct a church at Munna Creek.  Christ Church Anglican was dedicated in 1911. It was located on the northern side of Blowers Road to the west of the school and public hall (approx ). In 1947 the church was moved to 11 King Street, Gunalda, where it retained the name Christ Church Anglican.

The Munna Creek Country Music Festival was first held in 2011 and was held annually (except for 2020 due to the COVID-19 pandemic) until it was permanently cancelled in 2021.  Munna Creek Country Music Walk Up Weekend continues.

Amenities 
Munna Creek Hall is on Blowers Road but is accessible from the recreational reserve (former school) at 1458 Bauple Woolooga Road. Free camping is available in the hall's  grounds.

Events 
Munna Creek Country Music Walk Up Weekends are open-mic events where people can sing country music songs with a full backing band. They are held at the Munna Creek Hall three times a year.

Heritage listing 
Fraser Coast Regional Council has placed the following sites on its Local Heritage Register.

 Munna Creek Hall and grounds on Blowers Road Munna Creek
 Miva Cemetery on the Bauple Woolooga Road Munna Creek

References

Further reading 

 

Fraser Coast Region
Gympie Region
Localities in Queensland